DreamBox Learning is an online software provider that focuses on mathematics education at the elementary and middle school level. DreamBox Learning provides pre-kindergarten through 8th-grade students with over 2,000 lessons presented as animated adventures, games, and challenges.

History
In 2006, DreamBox Learning was founded in Bellevue, Washington by the CEO and serial entrepreneur Lou Gray, and former Microsoft employee Ben Slivka. In 2010, DreamBox Learning was acquired by the Charter School Growth Fund. The acquisition was sponsored by Netflix CEO Reed Hastings through a program-related investment. Jessie Woolley-Wilson became president and CEO of DreamBox Learning shortly after the acquisition.

The software was designed for students outside the classroom to augment their mathematics education and school districts seeking to enhance their mathematics curriculum. In 2012, the firm offered free trial licensing of lessons aligned with the Common Core State Standards Initiative to all schools within the United States. The company released a free iPad app, DreamBox Math Learning program, in 2013.

In 2014, the firm launched its Adaptive Math Curriculum for students in grades six through eight, with topics including basic functions, geometry, single-variable algebra, and ratios. Also in 2014, the International Society for Technology Education reported that DreamBox added Spanish language support to its adaptive math software for students in grades K-8 In 2016, the company updated its K-8 math curriculum with the ability to create custom assignments for individual students.

Funding
DreamBox has raised money through at least the following funding rounds.
 US$7.1M Seed, October 2007
 US$11M Series A, December 2011 – three investors: Reed Hastings, Kleiner Perkins, and GSV Capital.
 US$14.5M Series A, December 2013 – led by Reed Hastings and John Doerr.
 US$10M Series B, 2015 – led by Owl Ventures.
 US$130M Series C, July 2018

DreamBox Learning is partnered with the education startup Clever Inc. In 2016, The Center for Education Policy Research at Harvard University performed a study that found a positive correlation between using DreamBox's adaptive learning and test scores.

References

Education companies of the United States
Software companies of the United States
Companies based in Bellevue, Washington
Software companies established in 2006